Junqan (also Romanized as Jūnqān, Jūnaqān, Jūneqān, and Jūnoqān; also known as Jooneghan) is a city in Junqan District of Farsan County, Chaharmahal and Bakhtiari province, Iran. At the 2006 census, its population was 14,660 in 3,437 households, when it was one of the three cities in the Central District. The following census in 2011 counted 14,800 people in 3,933 households, by which time it became the center of recently established Junqan District. The latest census in 2016 showed a population of 14,433 people in 4,154 households. The city is mostly populated by Qashqai Turkic people and Lurs.

References 

Farsan County

Cities in Chaharmahal and Bakhtiari Province

Populated places in Chaharmahal and Bakhtiari Province

Populated places in Farsan County

Luri settlements in Chaharmahal and Bakhtiari Province